Axone is a 2019 Indian comedy-drama film directed by Nicholas Kharkongor and produced by Yoodlee Films, Saregama India's film division. The film stars Sayani Gupta, Vinay Pathak, Lin Laishram, Dolly Ahluwalia, Adil Hussain, Lanuakum Ao, Tenzin Dalha, and Rohan Joshi. The film follows Northeast Indian migrants in New Delhi, in their attempt to organize a wedding party. The film premiered at the London Film Festival on 2 October 2019.

Plot
The story tells of a group of migrants from Northeast India to Delhi, Upasana, Chanbi, and Zorem, who are trying to help their friend Minam with her wedding preparations. Minam, who shares a flat with Upasana, Chanbi, and others from their region, is called away suddenly for an interview. Meanwhile, her friends try to find an ingredient to make 'Axone,' a special dish that they want for the wedding. The friends face various difficulties as they attempt to plan the wedding and prepare Axone. The other tenants object and the landlord's mother-in-law enforces her rule against parties or spicy cooking in the flat. They decide to hold the wedding at Chanbi's boyfriend Bendang's flat, but finding a way to cook Axone without drawing the attention of locals brings comical problems.

Shiv, the landlord's son, and a friend of Zorem, lends his hand. His girlfriend breaks up with him when she sees him with Upasana, and later with Chanbi. As the wedding hour nears, the friends are discouraged at the thought of failing Minam (who has not yet returned). Zorem finally resolves to cook Axone on Upasana's landlord's terrace, and receives the landlord's permission in spite of his mother-in-law. The friends manage to prepare the Axone just in time for the wedding.

The marriage begins with Minam opening a video conference with her groom and family at her native home. The friends had not realised it was a long-distance marriage, with the  bride's sister standing proxy in Minam's place. They had gone through all the Axone trouble for a marriage that was not even happening in Delhi. After the wedding ceremony, Zorem proposes to Upasana and Chanbi decides to return to her native place with Bendang. Meanwhile, Bendang makes peace with a racist incident from his past. Finally, the friends treat themselves to Axone, while Shiv regrets that he can't find any mainland Indian cuisine.

Cast
 Sayani Gupta as Upasana
 Lin Laishram as Chanbi
 Lanuakum Ao as Bendang
 Rohan Joshi as Shiv
 Merenla Imsong as Balamon
 Tenzin Dalha as Zorem
 Asenla Jamir as Minam
 Dolly Ahluwalia as Nani, Landlord mother
 Vinay Pathak as Landlord
 Samit Gambhir as Rakesh (eve teaser), Supporting/ Guest Appearance
 Eliel R Famhoite as Lalrempui
 Milo Sunka as Hayna
 Aakash Bhardwaj as Hironya
 Deepansha Dhingra as Shiv's Girlfriend
 Jimpa Bhutia as Bunty
Pallavi Batra as Secretary's Daughter-in-Law
 Vijay Kumar Dogra as Rowdy neighbor
 Adil Hussain as the man outside Zorem shop (Special appearance).

Production
The film took 25 days to shoot on locations in New Delhi.

Release
The film premiered at the London Film Festival on 2 October 2019 and made its debut in India at the Mumbai Film Festival (MAMI) on 19 October 2019. The film was released on Netflix on 12 June 2020.

Soundtrack 

The multi-lingual soundtrack includes 
Papon, M. Mangangsana, Mangka Mayanglambam and Tajdar Junaid with lyrics written by Vaibhav Modi and Kh. Mangi Singh.

See also
 Akhuni

References

External links
 

Indian direct-to-video films
2019 direct-to-video films
2019 films
Films set in Delhi
Films shot in Delhi
Films about food and drink